Pillar of Fire is a 1995 historical fantasy novel by Judith Tarr. It deals with the reigns of Egyptian pharaohs Akhenaten and Tutankhamun and the Exodus from the perspective of a Hittite slave girl of Ankhesenpaaten. It draws heavily on Ahmed Osman's suggestion that Moses and Akhenaten were the same person.

The idea of Akhenaten as the pioneer of a monotheistic religion that later became Judaism has been considered by various scholars starting with Sigmund Freud's views in Moses and Monotheism. Tarr comments in the endnotes that she was surprised at how little she had to tweak historical fact to write the story.

The audiobook version, published in 1998, ran for approximately 22 hours and was read by Anna Fields.

Synopsis
Set in ancient Egypt the narrative is based on the notion that Moses and the Pharaoh Akhenaten were one and the same. Narrated in the third person from the viewpoint of a Hittite slave girl, the novel juxtaposes the Exodus story with the events in the Egyptian court. Sholars generally do not recognize the biblical portrayal of the Exodus as an actual historical event,

Awards
The novel was a NESFA 1995 Hugo Recommendation.

Reviews
Publishers Weekly said With her usual skill, Tarr (Throne of Isis) combines fact and fiction to create yet another remarkably solid historical novel set in ancient Egypt... This is a highly entertaining blend of romance, drama and historical detail."

Kirkus Reviews said that "The small but telling details of society and everyday life, the heart's-blood of historical fiction, are all too often absent here. Tarr's hard-to-swallow revisionist Exodus ends up neither engaging nor persuasive."

According to Brian M. Britt, who revers to Akhenaten as "quasi-monotheistic, "Tarr's novel represents the most dramatic connection between the Amarna phase of Egyptian history and Hebrew monotheism."

References

External links
 
 
 Rewriting Moses, by Brian Britt, references Pillar of Fire
 Describes Pillar of Fire "highly acclaimed".
Kliatt magazine, September, 1997, review of Pillar of Fire, p. 54
Library Journal, June 15, 1995, Cynthia Johnson, review of Pillar of Fire, p. 96
Publishers Weekly May 22, 1995, review of Pillar of Fire, p. 50

1995 American novels
American alternate history novels
Novels set in ancient Egypt
Novels based on the Bible
Novels set in the 14th century BC
Cultural depictions of Akhenaten
Cultural depictions of Moses
Cultural depictions of Tutankhamun
Third-person narrative novels